Joana Serrat i Tarré (born 1983 in Vic) is a Spanish folk singer, best known for her albums The Relief Sessions (2012), Dear Great Canyon (2014), Cross The Verge (2016), Dripping Springs (2017), and Hardcore from the Heart (2021), released in English and Catalan.

References 

1983 births
Living people
Spanish singers